DC Super Hero Girls is an American animated television series based on the DC Comics superhero media franchise of the same name.

Series overview

Episodes 
The title of every episode and short is styled as a social media hashtag.

Theatrical short (2018)

Super Shorts (2019–20)

Season 1 (2019–20)

Season 2 (2021) 
In April 2021, WarnerMedia officially announced that DC Super Hero Girls would return for a second and final season on June 6, 2021.

Crossovers 
In December 2020, May 2021 and May 2022, DC Super Hero Girls crossed over with another Warner Bros. Animation-produced and DC-based TV series, Teen Titans Go!.

DC FanDome shorts (2020)

Notes

References

DC Super Hero Girls
Lists of Cartoon Network television series episodes
Lists of DC Comics animated television series episodes
Lists of American children's animated television series episodes
Valentine's Day television episodes